Abdul Latiff bin Suhaimi (born 29 May 1989 in Kelantan) is a Malaysian professional footballer who plays for Malaysia Super League club Kelantan United.

Club career
In October 2013, Latiff left T-Team for Felda United. In November 2017, Latiff has extended his contract with Terengganu for another year. For 2019, he sign contract with Melaka United for one year.

International career
Latiff earned his first Malaysia national team cap in a friendly match against Papua New Guinea, which Malaysia lost 0–2.

Career statistics

Club

International

Honours
Penang FA
 Malaysia Premier League: 2020

References

External links
 Abdul Latiff Suhaimi Profile at Stadium Astro 
 Abdul Latiff Suhaimi at SoccerPunter.com

1989 births
Living people
Malaysian footballers
Malaysia international footballers
Penang F.C. players
Selangor FA players
Kedah Darul Aman F.C. players
Terengganu FC players
Terengganu F.C. II players
Felda United F.C. players
PDRM FA players
Kelantan F.C. players
Kelantan United F.C. players
Malaysia Super League players
People from Kota Bharu
People from Kelantan
Association football forwards